2009 Vissel Kobe season

Competitions

Player statistics

Other pages
 J. League official site

Vissel Kobe
Vissel Kobe seasons